SS Felix Riesenberg was a Liberty ship built in the United States during World War II. She was named after Felix Riesenberg, a mariner, explorer, civil engineer, chief officer of the United States Shipping Board, (USSB)  and author of marine textbooks.

Construction
Felix Riesenberg was laid down on 16 November 1944, under a Maritime Commission (MARCOM) contract, MC hull 2391, by J.A. Jones Construction, Brunswick, Georgia; she was sponsored by Mrs. N.M. Campbell, and launched on 14 December 1944.

History
She was allocated to the American West African Line Inc, on 26 December 1944. On 7 March 1951, she was sold to Pacific Waterways Corp., and renamed Transatlantic. In March 1959, she was sold to Alaska Steamship Co., and renamed Nenana. On 6 January 1971, she was sold to Jui Fa Steel & Iron Works Co., Ltd., Taiwan, for scrapping.

References

Bibliography

 
 
 
 
 

 

Liberty ships
Ships built in Brunswick, Georgia
1944 ships